Kim Kyong-il is the name of:

Kim Kyong-il (footballer, born 1970), North Korean footballer
Kim Kyong-il (footballer, born 1988), North Korean footballer